Dipterocarpus mundus is a species of tree in the family Dipterocarpaceae, endemic to Borneo. The species is found in lowland mixed dipterocarp forests.

References

mundus
Endemic flora of Borneo
Trees of Borneo
Flora of the Borneo lowland rain forests